"Oh, How I Miss You Tonight" is a popular song, published in 1925, written by Benny Davis, Joe Burke, and Mark Fisher. Popular recordings of the song in 1925 were by Ben Selvin, Benson Orchestra of Chicago, Lewis James and Irving Kaufman.

Other notable recordings
1941 Bing Crosby - recorded July 5, 1941 for Decca Records with John Scott Trotter and His Orchestra. 
1947 Perry Como - recorded on November 20, 1947 for RCA Victor with Russ Case and His Orchestra.
1960 Jeanne Black released a version of the song as a single which reached #63 on the U.S. pop chart.
1961 Jim Reeves
1961 Glenda Collins - Decca F11321
1962 Frank Sinatra - included in his album All Alone.
1962 Nat King Cole - for his album Dear Lonely Hearts.
1963 Frank Fontaine ABC-Paramount 45 RPM Single
1964 Burl Ives - for the album My Gal Sal
1967 Doris Day - included in her album The Love Album.

References

1925 songs
1960 singles
Songs with music by Joe Burke (composer)
Songs written by Benny Davis
Songs written by Mark Fisher (songwriter)
Bing Crosby songs
Perry Como songs
Jeanne Black songs
Nat King Cole songs
Frank Sinatra songs
Burl Ives songs
Doris Day songs
Jim Reeves songs
Deborah Allen songs
Capitol Records singles